Zahra Ahmadi (born 1982) is a British actress from Plymouth England of Persian descent. She is best known for playing the original Shabnam Masood in EastEnders.

Career
She is known for her role as Shabnam Masood in the British television series EastEnders from 2007–2008. In 2008, she appeared on an EastEnders-themed episode of The Weakest Link where she was voted off in the seventh round.

She played Sabia in Britz following which she played Nasreen in King of Hearts at the Hampstead Theatre. She appears in the IFC series The Increasingly Poor Decisions of Todd Margaret and also appeared in the 2010 film Tamara Drewe. In 2013 she appeared in a small role in Doctor Who episode "Nightmare in Silver", and in 2014 she portrayed the role of Gita in the feature-length Christmas special of Black Mirror entitled "White Christmas".

From 2013 to 2017, she played Sinem in all three series of the BBC Two sitcom Count Arthur Strong.

In 2016, she appeared in 5 episodes of Berlin Station. In 2018, she played Sameera in "Bliss" a Sky One comedy drama about a cheating travel writer who tries to balance his two chaotic family lives. Also in 2018, she played Daisy Anderson in season 7, episode 5 of Death in Paradise.

Filmography

Film

Television

References

External links

Living people
1982 births
21st-century English actresses
Actresses from Plymouth, Devon
Alumni of the Royal Welsh College of Music & Drama
British actresses of Asian descent
English people of Iranian descent
English soap opera actresses
English stage actresses
English television actresses